NetPIPE (Network Protocol-Independent Performance Evaluater) is a protocol independent performance tool that visually represents the network performance under a variety of conditions. It has modules for PVM, TCGMSG, and the 1-sided message-passing standards of MPI-2 and SHMEM.

See also
 Netperf
 Nuttcp
 Iperf

External links
 NetPIPE old releases web site

Computer network analysis
Network performance